Igor Mashechkin (born 1956) is a Russian mathematician, Professor, Dr.Sc., a professor at the Faculty of Computer Science at the Moscow State University.

He defended the thesis «Multifunctional cross-programming system» for the degree of Doctor of Physical and Mathematical Sciences (1996).

Author of 8 books and more than 100 scientific articles.

References

Bibliography

External links
 MSU CMC
 Scientific works of Igor Mashechkin
 Scientific works of Igor Mashechkin

Russian computer scientists
Russian mathematicians
Living people
Academic staff of Moscow State University
1956 births
Moscow State University alumni